Meknassy, sometimes spelt Maknassy, is a town and commune in the Sidi Bou Zid Governorate, Tunisia. In 2004 it had a population of 13,742.  It is in the governorate of Sidi Bouzid, 120 kilometers west of Sfax, and is a small administrative center (capital of delegation) and a marketing center for agricultural produce from the surrounding area, including fruit.

Its population is explained by the settling of Berber tribes (Confederation of Hammama) that nomadic steppe in the region.

The city is internationally known for breeding purebred Arabian horses and an annual festival of Arab thoroughbreds.

See also
List of cities in Tunisia

References

Populated places in Tunisia
Communes of Tunisia
Tunisia geography articles needing translation from French Wikipedia